Savage Glacier is a glacier at the east end of Thurston Island, lying south of Tierney Peninsula and flowing east to Seraph Bay. The glacier was discovered on helicopter flights from the USS Glacier and Burton Island by personnel of the U.S. Navy Bellingshausen Sea Expedition in February 1960. The Advisory Committee on Antarctic Names named the glacier for Lieutenant John Savage, U.S. Navy, dental officer aboard the Glacier, who assisted in establishing geodetic control points in the area.

See also
 List of glaciers in the Antarctic
 Glaciology

Maps
 Thurston Island – Jones Mountains. 1:500000 Antarctica Sketch Map. US Geological Survey, 1967.
 Antarctic Digital Database (ADD). Scale 1:250000 topographic map of Antarctica. Scientific Committee on Antarctic Research (SCAR), 1993–2016.

References

 

Glaciers of Thurston Island